Gandy–Gamna nodules or Gandy-Gamna bodies, sometimes known as Gamna-Gandy bodies or Gamna-Gandy nodules, are small yellow-brown, brown, or rust-colored foci found in the spleen in patients with splenomegaly due to portal hypertension, as well as sickle cell disease. They consist of fibrous tissue with haemosiderin and calcium deposits, and probably form due to scarring at sites of small perivascular haemorrhages. They are visible on MRI scanning due to the presence of haemosiderin.

They can also be seen in atrial myxomas.

They are named after Charles Gandy and Carlos Gamna.

References

External links 

Histopathology